GTB Nagar is a monorail station on Line 1 of the Mumbai Monorail located at Indira Nagar in the Sion suburb of Mumbai, India. Lies on the Truck Terminal Road which is nearby Wadala Truck Terminal.

GTB Monorail station connects with  railway station with the length of 800m far. and also

References

Mumbai Monorail stations
Railway stations in India opened in 2019